William FitzWilliam, 3rd Earl FitzWilliam (15 January 1719/20 – 10 August 1756) was a British peer, nobleman, and politician.

He was the son of John Fitzwilliam, 2nd Earl Fitzwilliam by his wife Anne, daughter of John Stringer of Sutton cum Lound, Nottinghamshire. His sister Anne was later second wife to Francis Godolphin, 2nd Baron Godolphin.

He succeeded his father as third Earl Fitzwilliam in the Peerage of Ireland on 28 August 1728. He was elected Member of Parliament for Peterborough on 4 May 1741, and sat until he was created Baron Fitzwilliam in the Peerage of Great Britain on 19 April 1742. He was made a Member of the Irish Privy Council on 6 June 1746, and further created Earl Fitzwilliam in the Peerage of Great Britain on 6 September 1746.

On 22 June 1744 at St George's, Hanover Square, Lord Fitzwilliam was married to Lady Anne Watson-Wentworth, daughter of the Earl of Malton. Lord Malton was later created Marquess of Rockingham; Lady Anne's brother was the future Prime Minister Charles Watson-Wentworth. Lord and Lady Fitzwilliam had two sons and six daughters:
 Lady Anne (23 March 1745 – 8 December 1819);
 Lady Charlotte (14 July 1746 – 11 February 1833), who married Thomas Dundas, 1st Baron Dundas and had issue;
 William Fitzwilliam, 4th Earl Fitzwilliam (30 May 1748 – 8 February 1833);
 Lady Frances Henrietta (22 October 1750 – 28 October 1835);
 Lady Amelia Maria (12 December 1751 – 8 August 1752);
 Lady Henrietta (20 March 1753 – );
 Lady Dorothy (22 May 1754 – 16 March 1809);
 George Fitzwilliam (28 February 1756 – May 1786).

Lord Fitzwilliam died at Marholm at the age of thirty-six and was succeeded as Earl by his son William. His widow Lady Fitzwilliam died on 29 August 1769.

References

1719 births
1756 deaths
Members of the Privy Council of Ireland
Earls in the Peerage of Great Britain
Peers of Great Britain created by George II
British MPs 1741–1747
Earls Fitzwilliam